HMH may refer to:
 Hamilton-Madison House, a settlement house in New York City
 Heineken Music Hall, in Amsterdam, Netherland
 History Meeting House, in Warsaw, Poland
 Holocaust Museum Houston, in Texas, United States
 Houghton Mifflin Harcourt, an American publisher
 Houston Methodist Hospital, part of the Texas Medical Center
Hackensack Meridian Health, a New Jersey Medical Institution
 Huishui Miao, a language of China
 Huntington Memorial Hospital, in Pasadena, California, United States
 Marine Heavy Helicopter Squadron; see List of active United States Marine Corps aircraft squadrons
 Huber-Mises-Hencky criterion, an alternative name for the von Mises yield criterion
 Hanumangarh, a city in Rajasthan, India